The Ministry of Justice (MoJ) is a ministerial department of His Majesty's Government headed by the Secretary of State for Justice and Lord Chancellor (a combined position). Its stated priorities are to reduce re-offending and protect the public, to provide access to justice, to increase confidence in the justice system, and uphold people's civil liberties. The Secretary of State is the minister responsible to Parliament for the judiciary, the court system and prisons and probation in England and Wales, with some additional UK-wide responsibilities e.g. the UK Supreme Court and judicial appointments by the Crown. The department is also responsible for areas of constitutional policy not transferred in 2010 to the Deputy Prime Minister, human rights law and information rights law across the UK.

The British Ministry of Justice may also oversee the administration of justice in Jersey, Guernsey and the Isle of Man (which are Crown dependencies), as well as Saint Helena, Ascension and Tristan da Cunha and the Falkland Islands (which are British Overseas Territories). Gibraltar, another British overseas territory, has its own Ministry of Justice.

The ministry was formed in May 2007 when some functions of the Home Secretary were combined with the Department for Constitutional Affairs. The latter had replaced the Lord Chancellor's Department in 2003.

The expenditure, administration and policy of the Ministry of Justice are scrutinised by the Justice Select Committee.

Responsibilities

UK-wide
Prior to the formation of the Coalition Government in May 2010, the ministry handled relations between the British Government and the three devolved administrations: the Northern Ireland Executive; the Scottish Government; and the Welsh Government.

Responsibility for devolution was then transferred to the re-established position of Deputy Prime Minister, based in the Cabinet Office.  He also assumed responsibility for political and constitutional reform, including reform of the House of Lords, the West Lothian Question, electoral policy, political party funding reform and royal succession.

After 2015, responsibility for devolution was transferred back to the ministry as well as the three offices for Scotland, Wales and Northern Ireland until 2019 when it was transferred to the Minister for the Union in the Prime Minister's Office. The role is currently held by the Prime Minister, Rishi Sunak. Reform of the House of Lords was given to the Leader of the House of Lords and the Cabinet Office. The West Lothian Question was given to the Leader of the House of Commons as was electoral policy and political party funding reform which is now handled by the Speakers Committee on Electoral Reform and the House Leader. Royal succession was given back to the ministry.

The Secretary of State for Justice had responsibility for a commission on a British bill of rights. The British bill of rights was a plan to implement human rights through national law, instead of the European Convention on Human Rights being part of our law through the Human Rights Act 1998. This would have also ended the binding authority the European Court of Human Rights has over British courts. This was later shelved, but recently, this has gained support since the UK left the European Union.

The Ministry of Justice retained the following UK-wide remit:
European Union and international justice policy
Freedom of information and data protection
Human rights and civil liberties
The Supreme Court of the United Kingdom
The National Archives

As the office of the Lord High Chancellor of Great Britain, the ministry is also responsible for policy relating to Lord Lieutenants (i.e. the personal representatives of the King), "non-delegated" royal, church and hereditary issues, and other constitutional issues, although the exact definition of these is unclear.

The post of Lord Chancellor of Ireland was abolished in 1922 though Northern Ireland remains part of the UK. The authority of the Lord Chancellor of Ireland was transferred to the Secretary of State for Northern Ireland.

England and Wales only

The vast majority of the Ministry of Justice's work takes place in England and Wales. The ministry has no responsibility for devolved criminal justice policy, courts, prisons or probation matters in either Scotland or Northern Ireland.

Within the jurisdiction of England and Wales, the Ministry of Justice is responsible for ensuring that all suspected offenders (including children and young people) are appropriately dealt with from the time they are arrested, until convicted offenders have completed their sentence. The ministry is therefore responsible for all aspects of the criminal law, including the scope and content of criminal offences. Its responsibilities extend to the commissioning of prison services (through the National Offender Management Service), rehabilitation and reducing offending, victim support, the probation service and the out-of-court system, the Youth Justice Board, sentencing and parole policy, criminal injuries compensation and the Criminal Cases Review Commission. The Attorney General for England and Wales (also the Advocate General for Northern Ireland) works with the Ministry of Justice to develop criminal justice policy.

Other responsibilities limited to England and Wales include the administration of all courts and tribunals, land registration, legal aid and the regulation of legal services, coroners and the investigation of deaths, administrative justice and public law, the maintenance of the judiciary, public guardianship and mental incapacity, supervision of restricted patients detained under the Mental Health Act 1983 and civil law and justice, including the family justice system and claims management regulation.

Crown dependencies
The Ministry of Justice is the department that facilitates communication between the Crown dependencies i.e. Jersey, Guernsey and the Isle of Man, and HM Government. These are self-governing possessions of the British monarch, through his titles as Duke of Normandy in the Channel Islands and Lord of Mann in the Isle of Man.

It processes legislation for Royal Assent passed by the insular legislative assemblies and consults the Islands on extending UK legislation to them. It also ensures that relevant UK legislation is extended to the islands smoothly.

Ministers
The Ministers in the Ministry of Justice are as follows:

The Permanent Secretary at the Ministry of Justice is Antonia Romeo, who is by virtue of her office also Clerk of the Crown in Chancery.

See also 

 Justice ministry
 Government of the United Kingdom
 Politics of the United Kingdom

References

External links
 
 Ministry of Justice careers 
 Ministry of Justice procedure rules
 Ministry of Justice organogram from data.gov.uk

 
English law
UK
Constitution of the United Kingdom
Ministries established in 2007
2007 establishments in the United Kingdom